Stand Up and Fight is the third studio album by the Finnish folk metal band Turisas, released worldwide on February 23, 2011 through Century Media as a single disc jewelcase and two disc digibook. It is based on the Varangian Guard, norsemen in the service of the Byzantine Empire.

Track listing
 "The March of the Varangian Guard" - 3:51
 "Take the Day!" - 5:26
 "Hunting Pirates" - 3:43
 "Βένετοι! - Πράσινοι!" (Venetoi! - Prasinoi!) - 3:49
 "Stand Up and Fight" - 5:27
 "The Great Escape" - 4:51
 "Fear the Fear" - 6:13
 "End of an Empire" - 7:13
 "The Bosphorus Freezes Over" - 5:37

Bonus disc track listing
 "Broadsword" (Jethro Tull cover, audio bonus track) - 5:01
 "Supernaut" (Black Sabbath cover, audio bonus track) - 3:57
 "Acoustic Jam Session" (DVD content. A live in-studio recording of the band playing acoustic versions of The March of the Varangian Guard, Stand Up and Fight, To Holmgard and Beyond) - 14:20

Personnel
 Mathias Nygård - vocals, keyboards, programming
 Jussi Wickström - guitars, backing vocals
 Hannes Horma - bass guitar, backing vocals, additional programming
 Olli Vänskä - violin, backing vocals
 Netta Skog - accordion
 Tude Lehtonen - drums

References

2011 albums
Turisas albums
Century Media Records albums